The Cromie Baronetcy, of Stacombrie, was a title in the Baronetage of Ireland. It was created on 3 August 1776 for Michael Cromie, who represented Ballyshannon in the Irish House of Commons. The title became extinct on the death of the second Baronet in 1841.

Cromie baronets, of Stacombrie (1776)
Sir Michael Cromie, 1st Baronet (–1824)  
Sir William Lambart Cromie, 2nd Baronet (c. 1780–1841)

References

Extinct baronetcies in the Baronetage of Ireland